The Commodore PC compatible systems are a range of IBM PC compatible personal computers introduced in 1984 by home computer manufacturer Commodore Business Machines.

Incompatible with Commodore 64 and Amiga architectures, they were generally regarded as good, serviceable workhorse PCs with nothing spectacular about them, but the well-established Commodore name was seen as a competitive asset.

History 

In 1984, Commodore signed a deal with Intel to second source manufacture the Intel 8088 CPU used in the IBM PC, along with a license to manufacture a computer based on the Dynalogic Hyperion. It is unknown whether any of these systems were produced or sold.

In 1984, the first model released, the PC-10, sold for $559 without monitor ($ in ). They were sold alongside Commodore's Amiga and Commodore 64c/128 lines of home and graphics computers. The PC10 was comparable in the market to the Blue Chip PC, Leading Edge Model D and Tandy 1000 line of PC compatibles.

Models 

The line consists of the following models:
Series 1

First generation - Series I:

Commodore PC 5:

 Introduced in 1984, at $1395, the Commodore PC 5 is the low-budget option with a monochrome video card. It has a Intel 8088 running at 4.77 MHz and 256k RAM on-board (expandable to 640k). RS232 Serial and Centronics parallel printer ports are on the motherboard rather than on separate cards thereby making more slots available. it has one 5.25" floppy drive and no hard disk (can be installed). The PC 5 was released with MS-DOS 2.11 and GW Basic 3.2. The PC 5 had 5x 8-bit PC BUS Slots. It has two motherboards. One contains the CPU, RAM and ROM v. 2.01, an NPU socket and some VLSI chips. The second mainboard is connected by gold pin connectors, it is an "I/O board" containing serial and parallel port, ISA slots and all I/O chips. Some tracks from ISA slots are factory cut by drilling. The early PC10 has no RTC, HDD controller or reset switch, in front it has DIN keyboard connector

Commodore PC 10

 The Commodore PC 10 is a PC 5 with a added color video card and two floppy drives
Commodore PC 10-1

 a 512k RAM and single floppy drive version. $519

Commodore PC 10-2

 640K RAM and dual floppy Drives. $619

Commodore PC 10-S

 a PC 10 with a single floppy drive. (PC 10 have two floppy drives) 

Commodore PC 20

 The Commodore PC 20 is a PC 10 with a 20 MB hard drive an only one floppy drive.

Commodore PC 40 / AT

 PC 40 is the top model of the first generation Commodore PC’s with improved 16bit "AT" hardware compared to 8bit XT in the others. It had a Intel 80286 that runs at either 6 or 10 MHz choosable by the user. Standard RAM was 1Mb and the video card was the same as in the PC 10 and 20. It had one 1,2 Mb 5.25 drive and a 20 MB hard drive. the cabinet had a key lock switch added Notes: The "PC AT" is a "PC 40" with a "AT" added to the name.

Second Generation - Series II

Commodore PC 10-II

 The Commodore PC 10-II is a minor revision of the original PC 10. It have mainly the same specifications and casing, but the main difference is that it has a new revised single motherboard opposed to the original PC 10 that have two motherboards combined. As the original PC 10, it comes with dual floppy drives and no hard drive.

Commodore PC 20-II
 The Commodore PC 20-II is a PC 10-II with one floppy drive and one hard drive

Third Generation - Series III

Commodore PC I
 The Commodore PC 1 is a special small form factor PC inspired by the design of the Commodore 128, meant for budget homes or office use. The PC 1 have no internal room for Harddisk, the "PC 1-20" Harddrive came with a 3.5" 20 Mb hard drive and can be connected to the expansion port. The machine can also be expanded with the "PC 1-NET" which added a Novell Ethernet 10 Bit card connected to the expansion port. Strangely there is no internal sound. but a 8 Ohm speaker can be added. there also was sold a expansion box for connection 3 ISA cards..
 Expansion slots: Commodore "PCEXP1" is a special expansion cabinet made for PC1. this gives 3 additional ISA Slots plus a extra 5.25 drive

Commodore PC 10-III

 The Commodore PC 10-III is a complete revision of the PC 10 and 10-II machine. it have a new sleeker cabinet and better specifications. while the two generations before only went at 4.77 MHz, the new III series uses an 8088-1 CPU capable of 10 MHz speeds. The PC 10-III/Colt Faraday FE2010 chipset allows the CPU speed to be adjustable via a SPEED.EXE utility via DOS or through keyboard commands. The default is the standard 4.77 MHz but the speed is adjustable to 7.16 MHz and 9.54 MHz. It also had more standard ram and a better video card. it is still a 8bit machine. it came with two floppy drives.
Commodore COLT

 An American version of the PC 10-III with slightly different front design. The front is a white variant of the PC 30-III front with the COLT logo on.

Commodore PC 10-III SD

 a PC 10-III with one floppy drive. (PC10-III have two floppy drives)

Commodore PC 20-III

 Same as PC 10-III but with a 20Mb HDD added.

Commodore PC 30-III (also sold as Select Edition 286)

 The commodore PC 30-III is a new generation AT machine with a EGA video card, a 3.5 floppy drive and a 20 MB Harddisk. The PC-30-III motherboard is the same as the PC40-III MB but with the VGA hardware missing from the Motherboard. (it is empty space on the motherboard for the VGA hardware)

Commodore PC 35-III
 PC-35-III is a PC 30-III but with VGA hardware added to the mainboard. same 20 MB harddisk as PC 30-III

Commodore PC 40-III
 PC 40-III is same as PC35-III, but with a 40Mb Harddisk.

Commodore PC 45-III

 same as PC-40-III but with an AMD equipped CPU instead of Intel in the PC-40-III

Commodore PC 50-II
 The Commodore budget 386 machine. it could be delivered with 40 or 100MB Harddisk or with just a3.5 floppy. it have SVGA

Commodore PC 60-III
 a top-of-the-line tower PC for professional use.
 Price: ?
 CPU: Intel 386DX 25MHz
 Optional CPU: A 387 FPU can be added.
 Standard RAM: 2Mb onboard RAM 
 Optional RAM: upgradeable to 18Mb RAM via two expansion cards with max 8 Mb on each card.
 Video Card: Paradise 88 VGA card 
 Floppy Drive: One Chinon FB-357 1.44Mb 3.5" and one Chinon FZ-506 1.2Mb 5.25" floppy drive. 
 Harddrive: It came with different choices of hard drive from 60Mb to 200Mb hard disk.
 Expansion Bays: 4x 5.25 bay and 2x 3.5 bay.
 Expansion Slots: 7x 16bit AT expansion slots + 2x Commodore Slots for memory card. 9 total. 

Generation 4 SlimLine series

Commodore 286 SX
 Price:
 Description: Slimline computercase
 Motherboard year: 1991
 Processor: Intel 80286 running at 8/16 Mhz. (A 80287-16 FPU can be added to an empty slot.)
 ROM: 64KB Phoenix Bios
 RAM: 1MB onboard standard, expandable to 5MB
 Video Card: VGA 256K Byte, expandable to 512K
 Disk drive: 1x Chinon F-502L 360k 5.25 drive.(Optional 720k Commodore 1010 og 1011 can be added to the Amiga style Disk port on the right side)
 Harddrive: 40 MB - (313241-02), 50 MB - (311839-01) and 100 MB - (311840-01)
 Network: the "PC 1-NET" came with a Novell Ethernet 10 Bit card connected to the expansion port.
 Options: Expansion box for connection isa cards and Harddrive. an additional 8 Ohm speaker can be added for sound.
 Operating System: MS-DOS 3.20 and GW-BASIC
 Ports: VGA, Component video, RSR-232 Serial port, Centronic Parallel port.
 Expansion slots: 16 bit x1 (expandable to 16 bit x 3 + 8 bit x 2 by use of riser card)
 Keyboard: 84 Key XT Keyboard
 Cabinet: Special small form factor inspired by the 128C

Commodore 286-16
 A 16MHz 286 with 1Mb RAM, VGA video card, 3.5" floppy drive and 2x AT 16bit expansion slots.

Commodore 386SX-16
 A 16Mhz 386 with 1Mb RAM, VGA graphics card, 3.5" floppy drive and 5x 16bit ISA expansion slots.Commodore 386SX-16 A 25Mhz 386 with a Cyrix 387 FPU, 4Mb RAM, Cirrus Logic GD-5402 VGA (512kb video RAM), 40Mb HDD, 3.5" floppy drive and 5x 16bit ISA expansion slots.Commodore 386DX-33 A 33MHz 386 CPUCommodore 486SX-25 A 25MHz 486 with 4Mb RAM, VGA video, 1x 3.5" drive and a 150Mb HDDCommodore 486DX-33 CPU: 33MHz 486 with
 RAM: 8Mb RAM, 
 Video Card: VGA video, 
 Floppy drive: 1x 3.5" 
 Harddisk: 150Mb HDDLaptopsCommodore C286SX-LT a 12Mhz 286 with 1Mb RAMCommodore C386SX-LT'''
 a 386 with 2Mb RAM and a 40Mb HDD

See also 
 3D Microcomputers, a Canadian computer manufacturer whom Commodore Canada authorized to produce PC clones bearing the Commodore label shortly before Commodore International's bankruptcy in 1994

References

External links 

 Richard Lagendijk: CIP - Commodore Info Page
 Bo Zimmerman: Commodore turns blue
 Bo Zimmerman's Commodore gallery
 OLD-COMPUTERS.COM
 Brochure comparing a number of Commodore Models
Commodore History Part 6 - The PC Compatibles By The 8-Bit Guy
 Brochure for the Commodore PC10-1 and PC10-2 at classic.technology

IBM PC compatibles
Commodore computers
Computer-related introductions in 1984